Fyodor Vladimirovich Milovanov (born 6 March 1979) is a former Russian professional football player.

Club career
He played in the Russian Football National League for FC Tom Tomsk in 2000.

References

1979 births
Footballers from Voronezh
Living people
Russian footballers
Association football forwards
FC Tom Tomsk players
FC Ural Yekaterinburg players
FC Salyut Belgorod players
FC Fakel Voronezh players
FC Dynamo Stavropol players
FC Torpedo Moscow players
FC Lukhovitsy players
FC Spartak-MZhK Ryazan players
FC Dynamo Makhachkala players